The Samsung Galaxy A23 is an Android-based smartphone designed, developed and marketed by Samsung Electronics as a part of its Galaxy A series. This phone announced on March 04, 2022 alongside the Galaxy A13.

Design 

The screen is made of Corning Gorilla Glass 5. The back panel and side are made of glossy plastic.

The design of the smartphone is similar to the Samsung Galaxy A33 5G.

Below are the USB-C connector, speaker, microphone and 3.5 mm audio jack.  The second microphone is located on top.  Depending on the version, there is a slot for 1 SIM card and a microSD memory card up to 1 TB or a slot for 2 SIM cards and a microSD memory card up to 1 TB.  On the right are the volume buttons and the smartphone lock button, which has a built-in fingerprint scanner.

Samsung Galaxy A23 is sold in 4 colors: black (Awesome Black), white (Awesome White), blue (Awesome Blue) and orange (Awesome Peach).

Specifications

Hardware 
Galaxy A23 is a smartphone with a slate-type factor form, the size of which is 164.5 × 76.9 × 8.4 mm and weighs 195 grams.

The device is equipped with GSM, HSPA and LTE connectivity and Wi-Fi 802.A/b/g/n/ac dual-band with Bluetooth 5 Wi-Fi Direct support and hotspot support.0 with A2DP and LE, GPS with A-GPS, BeiDou, Galileo and GLONASS and NFC. It has a USB-C port 2.0 and 3.5 mm audio jack input.

It has a 6.6 inch diagonal touchscreen, TFT LCD Infinity-V-type, rounded corners and 1080 × 2408 pixel FHD+ resolution.

The 5000 mAh lithium polymer battery is not removable from the user. Supports ultra-fast charging at 25 W.

The chipset is a Qualcomm Snapdragon 680 (SM6225) with an eighth-core CPU (4 cores at 2.4 GHz + 4 cores at 1.9 GHz). The internal eMMC-type memory 5.1 is 64/128 GB expandable with microSD up to 1 TB, while RAM is 4, 6 or 8 GB (depending on the version chosen).

The back camera has a 50 megapixel main sensor with an f/1 opening.The D-SLR-Focus is equipped with a PDAF auto focus, HDR mode and flash LED mode, capable of recording up to 1080p to 30photograms per second, while the front camera is single 8MP with a blank recording.

Software 
The operating system is Android 12 with One UI 4.1. It can be updated to Android 13 with One UI 5.0.

References 

Samsung Galaxy
Mobile phones introduced in 2022
Android (operating system) devices
Samsung smartphones
Mobile phones with multiple rear cameras